J. F. Oberlin (31 August 1740 – 1 June 1826) was an Alsatian pastor and a philanthropist. He has been known as John Frederic(k) Oberlin in English, Jean-Frédéric Oberlin in French, and Johann Friedrich Oberlin in German.

Life

Oberlin was born the son of Johann Georg Oberlin (1701–1770), a teacher, and Maria Magdalena (1718–1787), daughter of lawyer Johann Heinrich Feltz, on 31 August 1740 in the German-speaking city of Strasbourg, where he studied theology. In 1766 he became Protestant pastor of Waldbach (now Waldersbach), a remote and barren region in the Steinthal (Ban de la Roche/Steintal), a valley in the Vosges on the borders of Alsace and Lorraine.
 
Oberlin set out to improve both the material and the spiritual condition of the inhabitants.  He began by encouraging the construction of roads through the valley and the erection of bridges, rallying the peasantry to the enterprise by his personal example. He introduced an improved system of agriculture. Substantial cottages were erected, and various industrial arts were introduced. He founded an itinerant library, originated infant schools (precursors of the modern nursery schools of France) and established an ordinary school at each of the five villages in the parish. In the work of education he received great assistance from his housekeeper, Louisa Scheppler (1763–1837). He practiced medicine among them, founded a savings and loan bank and introduced cotton manufacturing.

Beside all this Oberlin was a man of rare spirituality, being frequently styled “a saint of the Protestant church,” and an excellent pastor, who preached each month three sermons in French and one in German. In 1812 Daniel Legrand visited the Steinthal (Ban de la Roche), where he met Oberlin, who lived in Waldersbach. Legrand came under the spell of the pastor, and moved with his ribbon factory to the village of Urbach in the vicinity of Waldersbach, where he lived for the rest of his life.

Oberlin died at Waldersbach on 1 June 1826 and was interred with great manifestations of honor and affection at Urbach (now Fouday, Bas Rhin).

Legacy

Oberlin has been called the "true precursor of social Christianity in France."
Daniel Legrand's grandson was Tommy Fallot, founder of "Christianisme social."
Legrand and Robert Owen (1771–1853) of Wales, another industrialist, advocated creation of an international organization dedicated to reform of labor laws.
Oberlin's orphan asylums were the beginning of the many “Oberlinvereine” for the protection of children, such as in Leonberg, Potsdam and Worms.

Oberlin, Ohio, a Christian colony, and its centerpiece, Oberlin College, a liberal arts college, were named for him upon their founding in 1833. J. F. Oberlin University in Tokyo, Japan, which was named for Oberlin College, also bears his name. Oberlin, Louisiana, was also named after him.

His brother Jérémie Jacques Oberlin was a noted archaeologist and philologist.

References

Sources

Further reading

External links

 Oberlin Museum at Waldersbach
 Oberlin's Namesake, a multimedia presentation on J.F. Oberlin

1740 births
1826 deaths
Clergy from Strasbourg
French Protestant ministers and clergy
French philanthropists
Alsatian-German people